Hermoso is a surname. Notable people with the name include:

 Albert Hermoso Farras (born 1978), Spanish Olympic eventing rider
 Eugenio Hermoso (1883–1963), Spanish painter
 Jennifer Hermoso (born 1990), Spanish footballer
 Manuel Hermoso (born 1935), Canarian politician
 Mario Hermoso (born 1995), Spanish footballer
 Miguel Hermoso (born 1942), Spanish film director and screenwriter
 Remy Hermoso (born 1946), American baseball player
 Ximena Hermoso (born 1991), Mexican tennis player

See also